Padmavati Shaligram Gokhale (1918 – 20 July 2014) was a Hindustani music vocalist, instrumentalist, and music educator.

Shaligram was born in Kolhapur, Maharashtra. Gokhale performed all over Hindustan (India and Pakistan) before partition. Her gayaki had the traditional elements of the Jaipur-Atrauli gharana with the swar–lagav which was influenced by the Kirana gharana. Padmavatitai was also a teacher and trained numerous disciples. Some of them are Kedar Naphade, Shubhada Paradkar, Sunita Tikare, Anita Sundararajan, Geeta Javdekar, and others. Her style bears distinctive gayaki of Alladiya Khan's style.

ITC SRA rediscovered Padmavati Shaligram for the Kolkata audience after decades, on the platinum jubilee year of her singing career in November 2005. She received "Sangeet Natak Academy Award" in 1988 by Govt. of India. she is also the recipient of, Kalidas Award in 1994–95, Award from Akhil Bharatiya Gandharva Mahavidyalaya Mandal. Padmavati Shaligram Gokhale presented two compositions set to Teentaal in Shuddha Sarang without using Madhyams.

Gokhale contributed to the acceptance and respect of Thumri. She died at the age of 96 on 20 July 2014 in Mumbai.

References 

ITC Entertainment
Hindustani classical music albums
Hindustani music
Recipients of the Sangeet Natak Akademi Award
Akhil Bharatiya Vidyarthi Parishad
Gharana
Jaipur gharana
Thumri
1918 births
2014 deaths